"Even Cowgirls Get the Blues" is a song written by Rodney Crowell. It has since been covered by several artists, notably La Costa, Emmylou Harris and Lynn Anderson. Crowell claims to have written "Even Cowgirls Get The Blues" about Harris and her pal Susanna Clark. The title of the song is taken from the then-popular novel of the same name by author Tom Robbins. The song has been released as a single twice and has also has appeared on albums of various artists.

LaCosta version
"Even Cowgirls Get the Blues" was originally a single release by American country artist La Costa in 1978. It was recorded on July 28, 1977, at the United Western Studio, located in Hollywood, California. The session was produced by Doug Gilmore, La Costa's producer for her 1977 album of the same name.

LaCosta's version was released as a single in January 1978 via Capitol Records. Her version only became a minor hit that year when it reached number 79 on the Billboard Hot Country Singles chart. It was the second of three singles spawned from her fourth album for Capitol Records, which was first released in 1977. Additional singles from the same album also reached minor chart positions.

Track listings
7" vinyl single
 "Even Cowgirls Get the Blues" – 3:17
 "Alice, Texas" – 3:00

Chart performance

Other notable versions
While it has been released twice as a single, "Even Cowgirls Get the Blues" was notably recorded by other music artists as well. Following its first single release in 1978, American actress and singer Mary Kay Place recorded a version for her 1977 studio album, Aimin' to Please. The song was the eighth track featured on Place's record.

In 1979, it was featured as a track on American country artist Emmylou Harris' Blue Kentucky Girl with vocal harmonies by Dolly Parton and Linda Ronstadt (initially recorded during the 1978 sessions for their Trio album). Harris' version was the tenth track on the project. An alternative version of this song with verses performed by Harris, Ronstadt and Parton later appeared on The Complete Trio Collection (2016) album.

In 1986, the song appeared on the collaborative studio project by Johnny Cash and Waylon Jennings. The song was recorded as a duet between both artists and was the sixth track of their album Heroes. In 1993, it was released on Rodney Crowell's compilation album Greatest Hits. It was the second track on the compilation.

Lynn Anderson version

"Even Cowgirls Get the Blues" was notably recorded by American country artist Lynn Anderson in 1980. It became a minor hit that year in North America. Anderson's version was recorded at the Columbia Studio in April 1980, located in Nashville, Tennessee. The session was produced by Gary Klein and Charles Koppelman, her first production assignment with the pair.

"Even Cowgirls Get the Blues" was first released as a single in May 1980. The song spent 13 weeks on the Billboard Hot Country Singles chart before reaching number 26 in September 1980. It also became a top 40 hit on the Canadian RPM Country Songs chart, reaching number 23 the same year. The song was issued on Anderson's 1980 studio album of the same name.

Track listings 
7" vinyl single
 "Even Cowgirls Get the Blues" – 2:57
 "See Through Me" – 4:03

Chart performance

References

1978 singles
1978 songs
1980 singles
Capitol Records singles
Columbia Records singles
Emmylou Harris songs
Lynn Anderson songs
Rodney Crowell songs
Songs written by Rodney Crowell